The  Franconian Line is a geological fault in south-eastern Germany that forms the border between the South German Scarplands in the west and the Fichtel Mountains in the east.

The Franconian Line was formed as part of the Variscan orogenesis and was most active between 100 and 50 million years ago, when the Fichtel, with its blocks of Hercynian granite, pre-Hercynian gneissess and Palaeozoic metasedimentary rocks were uplifted above its forelands that were later filled with Mesozoic-Tertiary sediments.

Tectonics
South German Scarplands